Zhang Lei (born 11 January 1985 in Shanghai), she was a member of the China women's national volleyball team who plays in the opposite position. She played for Shanghai in China.

Club career
  Shanghai (2001-2013)
  Igtisadchi Baku (2013-2014)
  Shanghai (2014–2021)

Awards

Clubs
 2013–14 Azerbaijan Super League -  Bronze Medal, with Igtisadchi Baku

References

Chinese women's volleyball players
Living people
1985 births
Volleyball players from Shanghai
Asian Games medalists in volleyball
Volleyball players at the 2010 Asian Games
Igtisadchi Baku volleyball players
Olympic volleyball players of China
Volleyball players at the 2012 Summer Olympics
Asian Games gold medalists for China
Medalists at the 2010 Asian Games
Universiade medalists in volleyball
Opposite hitters
Chinese expatriate sportspeople
Chinese expatriate sportspeople in Azerbaijan
Expatriate volleyball players in Azerbaijan
Universiade silver medalists for China
Medalists at the 2011 Summer Universiade